Churikov (Russian: Чуриков) is a Russian masculine surname, its feminine counterpart is Churikova. It may refer to the following notable people:
Inna Churikova (1943–2023), Russian film and theatre actress
Vyacheslav Churikov (1970–2014), Russian football player
Yana Churikova (born 1978), Russian journalist and television host 

Russian-language surnames